Kunj Bihari Lal Rathi (1910–1968)  was a leader of Bharatiya Jan Sangh from Uttar Pradesh. he served as member of Rajya Sabha from 1966 to 1968.

References

1910 births
1968 deaths
Rajya Sabha members from Uttar Pradesh
Bharatiya Jana Sangh politicians